Meraldene or Merabtene is a village in the Boumerdès Province in Kabylie, Algeria.

Location
The village is surrounded by Meraldene River, the Meraldene Dam and the town of Thénia in the Khachna mountain range.

Zawiya

 Zawiyet Sidi Boushaki

History
This village has experienced the facts of several historical events:
Battle of the Col des Beni Aïcha (1837)
Battle of the Col des Beni Aïcha (1846)
Battle of the Col des Beni Aïcha (1871)

Structures
 Meraldene Dam

Water
 Meraldene River

Notable people

 Sidi Boushaki, Algerian theologian.
 Cheikh Ali Boushaki, Algerian leader.
 Cheikh Mohamed Boushaki, Algerian leader.
 Ali Boushaki, Algerian theologian.
 Mohamed Seghir Boushaki, Algerian politician.
 Amine ibn El Boushaki, Algerian judoka.
 , Algerian academician.
 Mustapha Ishak Boushaki, Algerian academician.
 Shahnez Boushaki, Algerian basketball player.
 Firmus, Berber leader.
 Gildo, Berber leader.
 Mascezel, Berber leader.
 , Berber leader.

Gallery

References

Villages in Algeria
Boumerdès Province
Kabylie